The 2016–17 Canisius Golden Griffins men's basketball team represented Canisius College during the 2016–17 NCAA Division I men's basketball season. The Golden Griffins, led by first-year head coach Reggie Witherspoon, played their home games at the Koessler Athletic Center in Buffalo, New York as members of the Metro Atlantic Athletic Conference. They finished the season 18–16, 10–10 in MAAC play to finish in a tie for sixth place. They defeated Marist in the first round of the MAAC tournament to advance to the Quarterfinals where they lost to Saint Peter's. They were invited to the CollegeInsider.com Tournament where they lost in the first round to Samford.

Previous season
The Golden Griffins finished the 2015–16 season 14–19, 8–12 in MAAC play to finish in a tie for seventh place. They defeated Niagara in the first round of the MAAC tournament to advance the Quarterfinals where they lost to Iona.

On May 20, 2016, head coach Jim Baron announced his retirement. He finished at Canisius with a four-year record of 73–59. On May 28, the school hired Reggie Witherspoon as head coach.

Roster

Schedule and results

|-
!colspan=9 style=| Exhibition

|-
!colspan=9 style=| Regular season

|-
!colspan=9 style=| MAAC tournament

|-
!colspan=9 style=| CIT

References

Canisius Golden Griffins men's basketball seasons
Canisius
Canisius